The Shady Rest Golf and Country Club is located at 820 Jerusalem Road in the Township of Scotch Plains in Union County, New Jersey. Established in 1921, it was one of the first, if not the first, African American country clubs in the United States. From 1931 to 1964, it was the home of John Shippen (1879–1968), the first American golf professional and the first African American to compete in the U.S. Open. It was added to the National Register of Historic Places on July 7, 2022, for its significance in entertainment, ethnic heritage, recreation, and social history from 1921 to 1964. The township acquired the property in 1938 and converted it to a public golf course in 1964.

History
In 1798, Ephraim Tucker Sr. sold his  farm to his son, Ephraim. Based on architectural and dendrochronology evidence, the son tore down the existing farmhouse and built a new two-story house. In 1808, he sold it to John Losey and his wife, Sarah. In 1830, Benjamin Losey inherited the house from his father, John, and soon built a two and one-half story section with Greek Revival style. Robert Rhea Johnston and his wife, Mary, were living here . The property remained in the family until 1882, when it was sold by the estate to George B. Osborn and his wife, Ellenora. She later lived in Westfield and sold the farm in 1899. Inter-Urban Realty Co. subsequently owned the property.

In 1900, the Westfield Country Club was organized as a golf club. It leased the land from Inter-Urban, built a 9-hole golf course and used the Osborn farmhouse as its clubhouse. At about this time, the house was expanded by adding two one-story wings and a full-length two-story porch with four columns. The club bought the property in 1912. Unable to expand, the club merged with the Cranford Golf Club to form the Echo Lake Country Club in 1921.

In 1921, the Progressive Realty Corporation was formed by African American residents and investors. They leased the property and opened the Shady Rest Golf and Country Club on July 28, 1921, with nearly 2,000 people attending. It was one of the first, if not the first, African American country clubs in the United States. Featuring a 9-hole course, six tennis courts, croquet, horseback riding, a baseball diamond and skeet shooting, it was the finest and longest lasting.

In 1931, John Shippen, the first American golf professional and the first African American to compete in the U.S. Open, became the club golf pro and groundskeeper. He lived there for over thirty years, until 1964, in an apartment on the third floor of the clubhouse. One room on the first floor is now dedicated for the John Shippen Museum.

Club financial problems led to the township acquiring the property in 1938 through a tax lien foreclosure, but allowing the club to continue operation. In 1964, the township converted it into a public golf course, named the Scotch Hills Country Club. The club was renamed back to its original name in its centennial year, 2021.

Course
A  9-hole golf course was built in 1900 by the Westfield Country Club. It was designed by David Smith Hunter, a Scottish golf professional. The course contributes to the NRHP listing.

Tournaments
On July 4 and 5, 1925, the club hosted the first International Golf Championship Tournament, also known as the National Colored Golf Tournament. It was won by Harry Jackson, with John Shippen second. The event was recorded on a newsreel created by Fox Films. The success of this tournament led to the formation of the United Golfers Association in 1926.

See also
National Register of Historic Places listings in Union County, New Jersey
Clearview Golf Club – listed on the NRHP in Stark County, Ohio
Meadowbrook Country Club – listed on the NRHP in Wake County, North Carolina

References

External links

 Press Release

Scotch Plains, New Jersey
Buildings and structures in Union County, New Jersey
Golf clubs and courses in New Jersey
National Register of Historic Places in Union County, New Jersey
Clubhouses on the National Register of Historic Places in New Jersey
Golf clubs and courses on the National Register of Historic Places
Greek Revival houses in New Jersey
African-American sports history
African-American history of New Jersey
Sports museums in New Jersey
Museums in Union County, New Jersey
New Jersey Register of Historic Places
Sports venues completed in 1921